Isaac Van Wart (October 25, 1762May 23, 1828) was a militiaman from the state of New York during the American Revolution. In 1780, he was one of three men who captured British Major John André, who was convicted and executed as a spy for conspiring with treasonous Continental general and commandant of West Point Benedict Arnold.

American Revolution 
A yeoman farmer, Van Wart joined the volunteer militia when New York was a battle zone of the American Revolution. Overnight on 22–23 September 1780, he joined John Paulding and David Williams in an armed patrol of the area. The three men seized a traveling British officer, Major John André, in Tarrytown, New York, at a site now called Patriot's Park. Holding him in custody, they discovered documents of André's secret communication with Benedict Arnold. The militiamen, all yeomen farmers, refused André's considerable bribe and delivered him to Continental Army headquarters. Arnold's plans to surrender West Point to the British were revealed and foiled, and André was hanged as a spy.

With George Washington's personal recommendation, the United States Congress awarded Van Wart, Paulding and Williams the first military decoration of the United States, the silver medal known as the Fidelity Medallion. Each of the three also received federal pensions of $200 a year, and prestigious farms awarded by New York State.

Personal life
Van Wart was born in the farm country of Greenburgh, New York, near the village of Elmsford.  He lived on the frontier and his birthdate is not recorded.

Van Wart married Rachel Storm (1760–1834), a daughter of Elmsford's most prominent family (from whom the settlement's original name, "Storm's Bridge", was derived).  He divided his time between his family, his farm, and his church (he became an elder deacon of the Dutch Reformed Church).  Van Wart was buried in the cemetery of the Elmsford Reformed Church in Elmsford, New York. His tombstone said that he died at the age of sixty-nine.

Legacy 
Van Wart died in Elmsford on 23 May 1828 and is buried in the cemetery of the Old Dutch Reformed Church on Route 9. A marble and granite monument was erected at his grave on 11 June 1829, bears the single emphatic word "FIDELITY", followed by this epitaph, 

The three militiamen were highly celebrated in their lifetimes: commemorations large and small abound in Westchester, and can be found in many disparate parts of the early United States. Among other honors, each of the men had his name given to a county in the new state of Ohio (1803), each along its western border: Van Wert County bears a common alternate spelling of the name. Adjacent Paulding County is located north of Van Wert County. Williams County is in the northwest corner of the state, separated from Paulding County by Defiance County.

Still, Van Wart and the others did see their reputations impugned by some. André at his trial had insisted the men were mere brigands; sympathy for him remained in some more aristocratic American quarters (and grew to legend in England, where he was buried in Westminster Abbey). Giving voice to this sympathy, Representative Benjamin Tallmadge of Connecticut persuaded Congress to deny the men a requested pension increase in 1817, publicly assailing their credibility and motivations. Despite the slight, the men's popular acclaim continued to grow throughout the 19th century to almost mythic status. Some modern scholars have interpreted the episode as a major event in early American cultural development, representing the apotheosis of the common man in the new democratic society.

Van Wart and his companions are honored on the monument erected at the site of the capture in Tarrytown, dedicated on June 11, 1829, by the Revolutionary general and congressman Aaron Ward of nearby Ossining. A Van Wart Avenue is located on the south side of Tarrytown, near the Tappan Zee Bridge. Three streets in the neighboring village of Elmsford, New York, are named for the militiamen, with Van Wart Street being one of the village's main roads. White Plains, New York, has a Van Wart Avenue in the southwest section of the city, off NY Route 22.

References

 Bibliography

Further reading

Genealogical and Family History of Southern New York and the Hudson River Valley (1913) Volume II, p. 457

1828 deaths
Continental Army soldiers
New York (state) militiamen in the American Revolution
People from Greenburgh, New York
American people of Dutch descent
Van Wert County, Ohio
1762 births
People of the Province of New York
Burials in New York (state)